Saad El-Din El-Shorbagui (21 July 1920 – 9 October 1992) was an Egyptian sports shooter. He competed in the 300 m rifle, three positions event at the 1952 Summer Olympics.

References

External links
 

1920 births
1992 deaths
Egyptian male sport shooters
Olympic shooters of Egypt
Shooters at the 1952 Summer Olympics
Place of birth missing